Aaron Best (born September 1, 1992) is a Canadian professional basketball player for the London Lions of the British Basketball League (BBL). He played college basketball for Ryerson.

College career
Best played at Ryerson University and he graduated in 2016. At his last season he had 17,8 points and 7,4 rebounds per game.

Professional career
Best started his professional career with the Lithuanian club BC Juventus. He has also played with the Raptors 905 in the G-League and Riesen Ludwigsburg in Germany. On September 2, 2019, he signed with Greek club PAOK Thessaloniki. Best signed with Boulazac of the LNB Pro A on July 28, 2020.

Second stint with Raptors 905 (2021—2022)
On December 30, 2021, Best was acquired via available player pool by the Raptors 905 of the NBA G League.

Hamilton Honey Badgers (2022–present)
On April 26, 2022, Best signed with the Hamilton Honey Badgers of the CEBL.

London Lions (2022–present)
On August 13, 2022, he has signed with London Lions of the British Basketball League (BBL).

National team
Best was picked in the preliminary squad of Canada for the 2019 FIBA Basketball World Cup completing multiple legs, but he was ultimately cut from the final roster.

References

1992 births
Living people
Basketball players from Toronto
BC Juventus players
Black Canadian basketball players
Boulazac Basket Dordogne players
Canadian expatriate basketball people in France
Canadian expatriate basketball people in Greece
Canadian men's basketball players
P.A.O.K. BC players
Raptors 905 players
Riesen Ludwigsburg players
Shooting guards
Sportspeople from Scarborough, Toronto